Arden International is a multiple formula racing team created and run by Christian Horner and Garry Horner. It currently runs teams in the Eurocup Formula Renault 2.0 and F4 British Championship, and formerly ran in the FIA Formula 2 Championship and GP3 Series.

It has been competing since 1997 and has raced in the Formula 3000 International Championship, the Italian Formula 3000 series, and the A1 GP series for Great Britain.

Due to the Arden's strong business connections and sponsorship, the team often signs Red Bull Junior Team drivers as a way to pave forward future F1 drivers. Many drivers have been Red Bull Juniors, including Michael Ammermüller, Neel Jani, Filipe Albuquerque, Sébastien Buemi, António Félix da Costa, Daniil Kvyat, Carlos Sainz, Jr., Dan Ticktum, Jack Doohan and Dennis Hauger.

History

Formula 3000
The team was initially created as a vehicle to enable Christian Horner to race in F3000 in 1997. According to Horner he set the team up with borrowed money, including a loan from his father, and persuaded P1 Motorsport founder Roly Vincini (whom Horner had driven for in his first season of F3) to take on the role of his race engineer. He bought a second-hand trailer for the team from Helmut Marko, who as head of the Red Bull Junior Team was one of Horner's main rivals as a manager in F3000, and whom he later worked closely with at Red Bull. He stayed in F3000 for 1998 and was joined at Arden by Kurt Mollekens, who showed good pace and led the championship at one stage. In the winter of 1998 family friend David Richards had been approached by Russian oil company Lukoil to enable them to enter motorsports sponsorship. As entries to F3000 were restricted, Richards agreed a deal with Horner that Prodrive would take a 50% stake in Arden, in return for Horner becoming team manager. As a result, the team signed Viktor Maslov as a driver under the Lukoil deal from 1999. The team started off poorly, and didn't have the pace to qualify for many races.

At the end of 1999, Richards sold a stake in Prodrive to Apax Partners, who didn't want to continue in F3000. Horner hence exercised the option to buy back the Prodrive stake. As the years went on, the team began to reap the results and was the best team of Formula 3000 in its last 3 years, showing new talents to motorsport world like Darren Manning, Tomáš Enge, Björn Wirdheim and Vitantonio Liuzzi.

The team won the Teams' Championship in 2002, 2003 and 2004. During those years, Wirdheim won the drivers championship in 2003, and Liuzzi won it in 2004.

During the teams 8 years in the series, it has scored 359 points, won 16 races and achieved 20 pole positions.

Italian Formula 3000
The team joined the Italian Formula 3000 series for 1999 and 2000. Their first season was poor with only one point to their name, but the 2000 season went significantly better, with Warren Hughes taking two wins, one pole position and three fastest laps for the team, and Darren Manning taking one win, one pole and one fastest lap too. The team finished with Hughes second in the championship, and the team winning it outright 51 points.

A1 GP
Arden operated A1 Team Great Britain in the first season of the A1GP series for 2005–2006. The team fared well in their first season, collecting 8 podium finishes and a single pole position, leaving the team 3rd in the championship with 97 points overall.

GP2
In 2005, the F3000 series was rebranded as the GP2 Series, Arden stayed on for the new series and achieved second place in the teams' championship with Heikki Kovalainen and Nicolas Lapierre, and second place in the Drivers' Championship with Kovalainen, who had 5 wins, 4 pole positions and a fastest lap to his name.

In 2006, Arden competed in GP2 with Lapierre and the rookie Michael Ammermüller (Neel Jani acted as a substitute for Lapierre when the latter was injured in the race at Monaco). This year, Arden suffered a significant drop in performance, and had only 57 points to show and a single win from Ammermüller, compared to the previous season's 126. Overall the team came fourth in the championship.

For 2007, Arden signed Bruno Senna, nephew of triple F1 champion Ayrton Senna, and A1 Team South Africa driver Adrian Zaugg. Zaugg was replaced for the final round of the season by Filipe Albuquerque. This season was even worse for the team compared to the previous year, only managing 42 points which resulted in a seventh-placed finish in the teams' championship, with Senna finishing ninth overall in the drivers' championship.

For 2008 and the newly founded Asia Series, the team was renamed Trust Team Arden, after its Dutch title sponsor Trust. The duo of Red Bull Junior Team driver Sébastien Buemi and Yelmer Buurman was its race line-up for both championships. For the Asia Series, Adam Khan raced for the first two rounds before being replaced by Buurman. The overall result in the Asia Series was the team finishing second in the championship, with 50 points and one win, and Buemi finishing second in the drivers' championship. Mid-season in the main series, Buurman was replaced by ART Grand Prix outcast Luca Filippi. The season went slightly better than the previous one with the team picking up 50 points, enough to take sixth place, and Buemi picked up two race victories to finish sixth overall in the drivers' championship.

Arden again took part in the Asia Series for the 2008–09 season, signing Luiz Razia and Mika Mäki. For the second round of the championship, held at the Dubai Autodrome, Mäki was replaced by Renger van der Zande, who was subsequently replaced for the rest of the season by Edoardo Mortara. Razia scored the team's only win of the campaign, which allowed Arden to finish sixth in the teams' championship. For the 2009 main Series, the team signed F3 frontrunners Sergio Pérez and Mortara. This was also another poor season for the team, as it finished well down the order in eighth place overall with only Mortara managing a single win.

For the 2009–10 Asia Series, Arden signed Charles Pic and Rodolfo González. After the first round, González was replaced by Javier Villa for the rest of the season. This was the team's most successful outing in the Asia Series, with an end result of 37 points and second in the teams' championship. Villa finished fourth overall in the drivers' championship with 19 points, and Pic finished fifth with a single race victory. For the 2010 main series, the team kept Pic and resigned González. However, the success from the Asia Series did not quite continue into the main series as the team eventually finished seventh with one win, courtesy of Pic. Arden finished with fewer points than in 2009, but still managed to beat the previous teams' championship result of eighth position.

For the 2011 GP2 Asia Series and 2011 GP2 Main Series seasons, the team signed Josef Král and Jolyon Palmer. The year was the team's worst so far in its GP2 history, as neither driver managed a win, pole or fastest lap in either series, and the team ended up finishing tenth in the Asia series and eleventh in the main series.

As the GP2 Asia Series had joined together with the GP2 main series in 2012, there were no longer two separate series. The team signed former 2008–09 Asia season driver Luiz Razia and former MW Arden GP3 sister team driver Simon Trummer for the 2012 season. Razia won the feature race of the first round in Malaysia, picked up two 2nd-place finishes during the two Bahrain rounds, and won again at Catalunya, Valencia and Silverstone. He finished the season as runner-up to champion Davide Valsecchi, whilst Trummer had a best race finish of seventh place to take 23rd in the drivers' championship. Arden finished third in the team's championship; its best result since 2005.

From there Arden struggled in subsequent GP2 Series, their highest constructor's finish being an eighth in 2013, and went without a win till the end of the series under the GP2 moniker.

GP3
From 2010 onwards, they have operated a GP3 Series team with Mark Webber, the team was called MW Arden.

The team signed Michael Christensen, Miki Monrás and Leonardo Cordeiro for their debut season. Their first venture into the new series proved difficult as they only accumulate 18 points for the whole season with 2 fastest laps, leaving them 9th in the championship.

For 2011, the team completely refreshed their line up by signing Mitch Evans, Simon Trummer and Lewis Williamson. The season overshadowed the previous as the team came second overall in the constructors championship with 69 points, and both Williamson and Evans scoring 1 win each and coming 8th and 9th in the drivers championship respectively. This would also be the season where the team picked up its first pole positions with 2 from Evans and 1 from Williamson.

For 2012, they retained Evans, and partnered him with David Fumanelli and Matias Laine. Evans former teammates Simon Trummer and Lewis Williamson had moved to the GP2 sister team, and the new Formula Renault team Arden Caterham respectively. At the first round in Spain, Evans won the feature race. At the third round in Valencia, Evans managed to collect pole position and went on to win another feature race.

Evans went on to win the championship in the 2012 season.

The team scored their second driver's championship with Daniil Kvyat the following season, with Carlos Sainz, Jr. and Robert Vișoiu finishing tenth and eleventh respectively. In the following two seasons, Arden scored fifth and third in the team's championship respectively, with the highest driver standing coming from a fourth place for Emil Bernstorff in 2015.

Jake Dennis, 2015 Eurocup champion Jack Aitken and Colombian Tatiana Calderón competed with the team for the 2016 season. Calderón being the first women to compete for the team in its 19-year history. With three victories from Dennis and Aitken, the team finished as runners-up to ART Grand Prix in the constructor's standings.

In January 2017, Niko Kari was signed to the team for the 2017 season, making him the first Red Bull Junior to compete with the team since Kvyat and Sainz. A month later, Steijn Schothorst and Euroformula Open champion Leonardo Pulcini joined Arden.

2018 line-up consisted of Gabriel Aubry, Julien Falchero and Joey Mawson The team has season without wins, with just two podiums achieved by Mawson.

Formula Renault 3.5

For 2012, Arden International entered an agreement with Caterham to join the Formula Renault 3.5 series as a joint team known as Arden Caterham. For their first season, they signed former GP3 driver for MW Arden Lewis Williamson, and one of Caterham F1's test drivers, Alexander Rossi.

Rossi scored his first podium finish with a third-place finish at the one race round at Monaco. After 3 rounds, Williamson was dropped by the team and the Red Bull Junior Driver Programme for failing to score a single point and was replaced by António Félix da Costa who had also replaced him at the Junior Programme too. On his debut, Da Costa scored two points with a ninth-place finish during the first race at the Nürburgring.

F4 British Championship
Jack Doohan, Dennis Hauger, Patrik Pasma and Sebastian Priaulx were Arden's drivers in the 2018 championship. Across the season, the team claimed eleven wins and claimed the teams' championship, with Doohan taking honours as rookie champion.

For the 2019 season, Arden signed Australian Formula Ford racer Bart Horsten and promoted British karting champions Alex Connor and Tommy Foster from their young driver programme, with Abbie Munro joining the team for the final three rounds.

In October 2019, Frederick Lubin became the team's first signing for the 2020 season, followed by Roman Bilinski and Alex Connor.

Formula Renault Eurocup
Oscar Piastri, Sami Taoufik and Aleksandr Vartanyan were 2018 Arden's drivers in Eurocup.

FIA Formula 2 Championship
For , the team signed Nirei Fukuzumi and Maximilian Günther, changing their team name from Pertamina Arden to BWT Arden. The team had another sprint win with Günther, but decreased from seventh to ninth in the teams' championship.

For the 2019 season, Arden began a technical collaboration with Mercedes-affiliated FIA Formula 3 and Formula E outfit HWA RACELAB and signed Alfa Romeo racing team's Test Driver, Tatiana Calderon as their first driver and Renault junior and reigning GP3 champion, Anthoine Hubert as their second driver. However, Hubert died after a crash during the 2019 Spa-Francorchamps Formula 2 feature race.

On 23 September 2019 Arden announced that Artem Markelov will return to the F2 series to run at Sochi and Abu Dhabi. He would be running the 22 car since the 19 was retired for the season in honor of Hubert.

However the team will not race for the 2020 season, and instead will be replaced by HWA Racelab.

BRDC Formula 3
Arden announced they would expand into the BRDC British F3 series for the 2021 season, with Frederick Lubin graduating from the F4 British Championship to take the first seat. Alex Connor filled the second seat for the first 3 race weekends, with Roman Bilinski taking over the seat from Spa onwards. Despite missing the first three rounds Roman Bilinski finished a respectable 7th in the drivers championship, in both his and the team's debut season in the championship. Bilinski was named 3rd in Autosport's 'Top 5 GB3 Drivers of 2021'.

Current series results

Formula Regional European Championship

In detail 
(key) (Races in bold indicate pole position) (Races in italics indicate fastest lap)

GB3 Championship

F4 British Championship

Former series results

FIA Formula 2 Championship

In detail
(key) (Races in bold indicate pole position) (Races in italics indicate fastest lap)

GP3 Series

In detail 
(key) (Races in bold indicate pole position) (Races in italics indicate fastest lap)

GP2 Series

In detail 
(key) (Races in bold indicate pole position) (Races in italics indicate fastest lap)

Formula Renault 3.5 Series

GP2 Asia Series

A1 GP Series

International Formula 3000 Series

Italian Formula 3000 Series

Eurocup Formula Renault

Timeline

Footnotes

References

External links

 Arden-motorsport.com, official team website.
 fiaformula2.com, team info at FIA Formula 2 website.
 GP3series.com, team info at GP3 Series website.
 

Dutch auto racing teams
British auto racing teams
International Formula 3000 teams
A1 Grand Prix racing teams
GP2 Series teams
GP3 Series teams
World Series Formula V8 3.5 teams
Auto racing teams established in 1997
1997 establishments in the United Kingdom
Auto GP teams
FIA Formula 2 Championship teams
Formula Renault Eurocup teams
Formula Regional European Championship teams